John Calvin Abney is an American musician, songwriter, and multi-instrumentalist from Tulsa, Oklahoma.

Career
In 2014, Abney released his debut EP titled Empty Candles. On January 25, 2015, Abney released his debut full-length album titled Better Luck via Foolish Philosophy Records.

Discography
Studio albums
 Better Luck (2015, Foolish Philosophy)
 Far Cries and Close Calls (2016, Horton Records/CRS)
 Coyote (2018, Black Mesa Records)
 Safe Passage (2019, Black Mesa Records)
 Familiar Ground (2020, Black Mesa Records)
EPs
 Without Wax (2012, self-released)
 Empty Candles (2014, self-released)
 Vice Versa Suite (2015, self-released)

References

Musicians from Tulsa, Oklahoma
Living people
Year of birth missing (living people)